Phyllidiella lizae is a species of sea slug, a dorid nudibranch, a shell-less marine gastropod mollusk in the family Phyllidiidae.

Distribution 
This species was described from Heron Island, Australia with additional specimens from Fiji, New Caledonia, Papua New Guinea and Cape Moreton, Queensland. It has been reported from Vanuatu and Sulawesi.

Description
This nudibranch has a pale pink dorsum with white-capped tubercles. There are narrow black lines which run in a zigzag pattern between the tubercle groups, joining at the tail. Connecting black lines run across the body and down the sides. The rhinophores are black with a pale grey base.

Diet
This species feeds on sponges.

References

Phyllidiidae
Gastropods described in 1993